Oscar Páez Garcete (1 September 1937 – March 29, 2016) was a Roman Catholic bishop.

Ordained to the priesthood in 1961, Páez Garcete was named bishop of the Roman Catholic Diocese of San Pedro, Paraguay, in 1978. He was then named bishop of the Roman Catholic Diocese of Alto Paraná in 1998 and served as bishop until 2000.

Notes

1937 births
2016 deaths
20th-century Roman Catholic bishops in Paraguay
Roman Catholic bishops of Ciudad del Este
Roman Catholic bishops of San Pedro